WVHY (97.1 FM) is a commercial radio station licensed in the US to Axson, Georgia. WVHY is part of a group of South Georgia Radio Stations playing Classic Hits, and is owned by Victor M. Vickers.

References

 WVHY. "FCC Station Information ", Federal Communications Commission, 12/03/2015.
 WVHY. " City of License Change ", Federal Register , 05/27/2014.
 WVHY. " Public Notice ", The Clinch County News, 09/11/2013.

External links

VHY
Radio stations established in 2016
2016 establishments in Georgia (U.S. state)
Classic hits radio stations in the United States